This is a list of years in Bolivia. See also the timeline of Bolivian history.  For only articles about years in Bolivia that have been written, see :Category:Years in Bolivia.

Twenty-first century

Twentieth century

Nineteenth century

Eighteenth century

See also 
 List of years by country

 
Bolivia history-related lists
Bolivia